Karl-Theodor Maria Nikolaus Johann Jacob Philipp Franz Joseph Sylvester Buhl-Freiherr von und zu Guttenberg (born 5 December 1971), known professionally as Karl-Theodor zu Guttenberg, is a German businessman and politician of the Christian Social Union (CSU). He served as a member of the Bundestag from 2002 to 2011, as Secretary-General of the CSU from 2008 to 2009, as Federal Minister for Economics and Technology in 2009 and as Federal Minister of Defence from 2009 to 2011.

After the discovery of plagiarism in his doctoral dissertation and the decision of the University of Bayreuth to revoke his doctorate, an affair known as Guttenberg plagiarism scandal, he resigned from all political posts in March 2011.

In 2011, Guttenberg joined the Center for Strategic and International Studies (CSIS). Guttenberg is the chairman and a founder of Spitzberg Partners, an advisory and investment firm based in New York City. He returned to German politics during the 2017 federal election by making a speech which was widely described as a comeback.

Education 
In 1991, after finishing high school (Gymnasium) in Rosenheim, Guttenberg completed his mandatory military service reaching the rank of Sergeant. Guttenberg studied law at the University of Bayreuth, where he passed the first legal state examination (said to be the equivalent of a master's degree) in 1999. Guttenberg chose not to pursue the second state examination (the equivalent of a bar exam), and focused on running the Munich-based "Guttenberg GmbH" holding where, along with a few employees, he managed his family's significant assets and various participations. Due to the holding's low turnover and small number of employees, it was said that Guttenberg had exaggerated his business experience. The Guttenberg GmbH had assets under management of at least a quarter billion euros, including a 26.5 percent stake in Rhön-Klinikum AG, which was sold in March 2002 to Bayerische Hypo- und Vereinsbank for 260 million euros. From 1996 to 2002, Guttenberg was a member of the board of directors of Rhön-Klinikum AG. Until September 2004, he was a managing director of the KT-Kapitalverwaltung GbR in Munich. 

Guttenberg studied law at the University of Bayreuth. He successfully defended his thesis "Verfassung und Verfassungsvertrag. Konstitutionelle Entwicklungsstufen in den USA und der EU" ("Constitution and Constitutional Treaty. Stages of Constitutional Development in the USA and EU"), and was awarded the academic degree Doctor of Law ("Doktor der Rechte") in 2007. Following accusations of plagiarism in Guttenberg's thesis, the University of Bayreuth conducted an investigation, culminating on 23 February 2011 with the revocation of Guttenberg's doctorate.

In 2019, Guttenberg again received the title "Doctor of Philosophy" from the University of Southampton.

Political career 

Guttenberg is a member of the Christian Social Union of Bavaria (CSU) and held different positions within the party, including that of secretary general.

Member of Parliament 
In 2002, Guttenberg was elected to the Bundestag as the representative of Kulmbach. He was reelected in 2005, winning 60.0% of the votes in his constituency. In 2009, he was reelected again with 68.1% of the votes in his district, obtaining the highest percentage of votes of all elected representatives in Germany for that election cycle.

From October 2005 to November 2008, Guttenberg served as chairman of the CDU/CSU parliamentary group in the Bundestag's Foreign Affairs Committee and as spokesman of the CDU/CSU parliamentary group in the Bundestag's Committee on disarmament, non-proliferation and arms control. He also chaired the CSU Foreign Policy Expert Committee and the German-British parliamentary group during that time.

Political positions 
In early 2004, Guttenberg introduced the concept of a Privileged Partnership between Turkey and the European Union as a viable alternative to accession of Turkey to the European Union into the German political discourse. Guttenberg based his opposition to full Turkish membership in the EU on the country's insufficient fulfillment of relevant accession criteria, for example with regard to the Cyprus dispute. At the same time, he stressed the necessity of maintaining good relations with Turkey and was therefore critical of a French initiative to criminalize the denial of the Armenian genocide.

Guttenberg also repeatedly warned of the looming threat posed to German and European security by Iran's nuclear and ballistic missile programs. However, he rejected taking rash military action against Iran and instead called for an international diplomatic effort to deal with Tehran's nuclear program. As a Member of Parliament, he was a strong critic of the far-left party Die Linke, which he accused of links to terrorists. He was also a member of the Europa-Union Parliamentary Group of the German Bundestag and a member of the Board of Trustees of the Foundation Memorial to the Murdered Jews of Europe.

Secretary General of the CSU 
In September 2008, the CSU suffered heavy losses in the Bavaria state election and lost its absolute majority in the Bavarian Landtag - for the first time in 46 years. As a result of this political defeat the CSU party leadership stepped down and Horst Seehofer, the new CSU chairman and minister-president of Bavaria, appointed Guttenberg as secretary general of the CSU in November 2008.

As secretary-general, Guttenberg called for tax cuts, an increase in family benefits and structural reforms within the CSU to foster more direct political participation of the party base. In addition to domestic policy he also emphasized his focus on international affairs.

Federal Minister of Economics 
After the resignation of Michael Glos on 9 February 2009 Guttenberg became Federal Minister of Economics and Technology in the first Merkel cabinet.
Guttenberg, the youngest economics minister in the German post-war era, came to office in the midst of a deep global financial crisis and recession.

In the wake of the global financial crisis, several major German banks were near failure, including Hypo Real Estate, which received €102 billion of credit and guarantees from Germany's bank rescue fund. In this case, Guttenberg opposed an overly hasty nationalization of Hypo Real Estate, which he considered only as "ultissima ratio, a measure of the very last resort". A few months later he drafted a legislative proposal to minimize the financial risks of failing banks, which caused controversy but later became the foundation of the German bank restructuring bill.

In the case of troubled German companies asking for state aid, including automaker Opel and now-defunct mail-order service Arcandor/Quelle, Guttenberg was reluctant to commit government resources. He insisted on strict conditionality, including restructuring, and limited support to only those companies which were otherwise competitive but were temporarily affected by the crisis.

In November 2008, Opel had appealed for governmental assistance because of severe financial problems facing its American parent, General Motors (GM). In 2009, Opel employed 25,000 workers in Germany and indirectly supported 50,000 additional jobs through its supplier network. In March 2009, Guttenberg made his first visit to the US as economics minister, focusing his trip on the future of Opel. In his talks with U.S. Treasury Secretary Timothy Geithner, the director of the United States National Economic Council, Lawrence Summers, and Rick Wagoner, then CEO of General Motors, Guttenberg demanded that GM provide a viable restructuring plan for Opel as a precondition for receiving financial assistance from the German state. Guttenberg and Wagoner agreed on the necessity of a private investor for Opel.

After Guttenberg's visit to the US, negotiations between the German government, GM, and potential Opel investors, including Fiat and Canada's Magna International, were stalled by GM and the U.S. Treasury. In contrast to Merkel and other German political leaders, Guttenberg preferred insolvency for Opel rather than the infusion of unconditional financial assistance from the German state. Because of the resultant financial risks to the German state, Guttenberg opposed the sale of Opel to Magna International, favoured by Chancellor Merkel, and—according to media coverage—even offered his resignation over the controversy. The Opel-Magna deal later failed, and Opel remained a subsidiary of GM, who had to reimburse financial assistance to Germany. In the summer of 2009, he surpassed Angela Merkel as the most popular politician in Germany.

Federal Minister of Defence 

The 2009 Bundestag elections led to a change in government, as the incumbent grand coalition of CDU/CSU and SPD was replaced by a center-right coalition of CDU/CSU and FDP.

According to German press reports, Chancellor Merkel offered Guttenberg the choice between the interior and the defence ministries while negotiating the distribution of ministerial posts within the new coalition government. Guttenberg decided to opt for the defence portfolio and took the oath of office on 28 October 2009 as part of the Second Cabinet Merkel. He was the youngest-ever German defence minister in the post-war era.

Afghanistan 
The first political challenge facing defence minister Guttenberg was dealing with the Kunduz airstrike of 4 September 2009. Initially, he adopted the position of his predecessor Jung and defended the air strike as "militarily appropriate". However, in contrast to Jung, Guttenberg conceded that the strike had also caused civilian casualties. After Guttenberg had received additional information and investigative reports dating back to the tenure of his predecessor Jung, Guttenberg changed his position concerning the "Kunduz airstrike" and dismissed Bundeswehr Chief of Staff Schneiderhahn and Parliamentary State Secretary of Defence Wichert on 26 November 2009.

Jung, who in the meantime had assumed the position of labor minister in the second Merkel cabinet, took full political responsibility for the delay in sharing relevant Kunduz air strike information and resigned the following day.

At the demand of the opposition parties, the Bundestag subsequently established a special investigative committee to shed light on the defense ministry's communications policy in connection with the Kunduz air strike.
The final report of the Bundestag's special investigative committee cleared Guttenberg from the accusation that he had been responsible for the defence ministry's inadequate communications policy following the Kunduz strike. The findings were supported by members from the ruling CDU/CSU-FDP coalition while the opposition parties criticized the special investigative committee's report and later published their own account of the investigation.

Shortly after taking office, Guttenberg publicly compared the situation faced by Bundeswehr soldiers in Afghanistan to "war". In doing so, Guttenberg broke a major political taboo since up until then Germany's political leadership – including the Chancellor and previous defense ministers – had only referred to the Afghanistan intervention as a "stabilization deployment".
The new classification of the Bundeswehr's Afghanistan deployment as "war" improved the legal status of German soldiers operating under international law.

Guttenberg attempted to elevate public perception of Germany's Afghan mission by personally participating - sometimes along with the Chancellor - at funeral services held for fallen Bundeswehr soldiers. In November 2010, Guttenberg established the Combat Action Medal of the Bundeswehr, which is awarded for bravery in combat and to soldiers who were the targets of terrorist or military attacks.

At the political level, Guttenberg spoke out strongly against a military withdrawal from Afghanistan. He specifically warned against imposing fixed troop withdrawal timetables that do not take into account the security situation on the ground. Furthermore, Guttenberg also demanded a stronger involvement of key neighboring states such as Russia, India, and China in the resolution of the Afghan conflict.
In light of the traditionally challenging security situation in Afghanistan, Guttenberg called for the development of an internationally coordinated long-term security strategy – based on the use of special forces and close intelligence cooperation within the coalition – to stabilize the country even after the eventual withdrawal of all foreign troops.

During his tenure as defense minister, Guttenberg made nine visits to Afghanistan and the German soldiers deployed there. To gain a first-hand understanding of the situation on the ground and the military risks of the Bundeswehr's mission, Guttenberg went several times to the frontlines of the Afghan conflict. He also invited journalists to accompany him on these trips in an effort to educate the wider German public about the nature of the Bundeswehr deployment in Afghanistan. In December 2010, Guttenberg traveled to Afghanistan along with his wife Stephanie to visit with the troops before the Christmas holidays. In addition, he was also accompanied by German TV moderator Johannes B. Kerner, who hosted his prime-time talk show at the Bundeswehr camp in Mazar-i-Sharif featuring the Guttenbergs and German soldiers deployed there. While other German media and the opposition parties sharply criticized Guttenberg for allowing Kerner to host his show in Afghanistan, the reaction by the German troops and the general public was predominantly positive.

Bundeswehr reform 
In early 2010, Guttenberg decided to push for fundamental Bundeswehr reforms in an effort to address the structural deficits within the German armed forces and to deal with declining defense budgets. The overall goal was to boost the Bundeswehr's expeditionary capabilities while, at the same time, achieving cost reductions. To accomplish these reforms, Guttenberg proposed to reduce the armed forces to 165,000 active duty soldiers and to suspend the draft, resulting in the most comprehensive restructuring of the Bundeswehr since its founding in 1955. Guttenberg's reform plans were supported by a blue-ribbon "Bundeswehr Structural Commission" that the minister created in April 2010. The proposals triggered a major debate about the country's draft system and were met with significant political opposition, not least in Guttenberg's own political party. In the end, Guttenberg's view won out and on 29 October 2010, the CSU general party convention approved the minister's motion to suspend the draft by a large majority. Several weeks later, Chancellor Merkel's CDU held its own party convention and also voted in favor of suspending the draft. In November 2010, a United States diplomatic cables leak revealed that American diplomats viewed Guttenberg positively, with one cable describing him as a "foreign policy expert, a transatlanticist and a close and well-known friend to the United States".

Plagiarism scandal and resignation 

In 2011, Guttenberg resigned amid controversy over his dissertation. The first accusations of plagiarism in Guttenberg's dissertation were made public in February 2011. Guttenberg's doctoral dissertation, "Verfassung und Verfassungsvertrag" ("Constitution and Constitutional Treaty"), had been the basis of his 2007 Doctorate from the University of Bayreuth. Guttenberg at first denied intentional plagiarism, calling the accusations "absurd," but acknowledged that he may have made errors in his footnotes. In addition, it emerged that Guttenberg had requested a report from the Bundestag's research department, which he had then inserted into his thesis without attribution. On 23 February 2011, Guttenberg apologized in parliament for flaws in his thesis, but denied intentional deception and denied the use of a ghostwriter.

On 23 February 2011, the University of Bayreuth withdrew Guttenberg's doctorate. In part due to the expressions of confidence by Angela Merkel, the scandal continued to evoke heavy criticism from prominent academics, legal scholars (who accused Guttenberg of intentional plagiarism), and politicians both in the opposition and in the governing coalition. On 1 March 2011, Guttenberg announced his resignation as Minister of Defense, from his seat in the Bundestag, and from all other political offices.

In May 2011, a University of Bayreuth commission tasked with investigating Guttenberg's dissertation came to the conclusion that Guttenberg had engaged in intentional deception in the writing of his dissertation, and had violated standards of good academic practice. The commission found that he had included borrowed passages throughout his thesis, without citation, and had modified those passages in order to conceal their origin.

In November 2011, the prosecution in Hof discontinued the criminal proceedings for copyright violations against Guttenberg on condition of Guttenberg paying €20,000 to a charity. The prosecutor found 23 prosecutable copyright violations in Guttenberg's dissertation, but estimated that the material damage suffered by the authors of those texts was marginal.

The doctorate affair also led to scrutiny of other politicians' doctorates, notably that of his colleague in the federal cabinet Annette Schavan and Hungarian President Pál Schmitt, who lost their doctorates for similar reasons.

Career after politics 
In September 2011, Guttenberg joined the Washington-based Center for Strategic and International Studies (CSIS). At the Halifax International Security Forum in November 2011, Guttenberg made his first public appearance since joining CSIS. During a plenary session on the economic and financial crisis he voiced pessimism about the current state of the EU and decried a severe "crisis of political leadership".

In November 2011, Guttenberg published the book "Vorerst gescheitert" ("Failed for Now"). The publication is based on a series of conversations with the editor-in-chief of Die Zeit, Giovanni di Lorenzo, in which Guttenberg talks extensively for the first time about his political career, the plagiarism scandal and his resignation, as well as his plans for the future. Guttenberg's criticism in the book of the direction which the CSU is headed sparked some controversy within his party.

Guttenberg is a strong critic of Russian president Vladimir Putin's expansionist foreign policy. In Spring 2014, he decried an "astonishing leadership vacuum in the world" and demanded that the West, and especially Europe, respond to Moscow's aggressions with strong political action. He praised Chancellor Merkel for her firm stance against Putin. Guttenberg appeared together with Henry Kissinger during a CNN interview about the Ukraine crisis and explained the significant domestic political resistance that Merkel's Russia policy faced in Germany. Several months later Guttenberg accused the EU of inaction and a lack of capabilities given the crises in Ukraine and the Middle East.

In spring 2014, Guttenberg formed Spitzberg Partners LLC, a consulting and investment company. In September 2014, Spitzberg Partners and Canadian Acasta Capital founded Atlantic Advisory Partners (AAP), a partnership to promote business and trade between Canada and the European Union in connection with the Comprehensive Economic and Trade Agreement (CETA).

Political comeback
Guttenberg returned to German politics by making a speech during the 2017 German federal election in which he hailed Chancellor Angela Merkel. The speech was widely reported on in German media and described as marking his comeback in German politics. Guttenberg also said Germany should preserve its relationship with the United States in order to renew the ties after the end of the Trump era, noting that "they won't forget it if, at a time when they were being mocked by the whole world, we maintained contacts with them and said this relationship is important now and will remain so in future."

Family and personal life 

Guttenberg is a member of the House of Guttenberg, first documented in 1158, and conferred the rank of baron by the Holy Roman Emperor in 1700. Since the adoption of Germany's 1919 Weimar Constitution, which abolished the nobility's privileges, "noble titles form part of the name only".

His grandfather, Karl Theodor Freiherr von und zu Guttenberg (1921–1972), was a CSU politician and hard-line conservative during the Cold War, noted for his opposition to the Ostpolitik. During the Second World War, he narrowly escaped execution after refusing to kill Jews, stating that he would rather shoot SS members. Several other members of Guttenberg's family also offered resistance to the Nazi regime, among them his great-grandfather Georg Enoch Freiherr von und zu Guttenberg, and Karl Ludwig Freiherr von und zu Guttenberg, a great-great-uncle of Guttenberg. Karl Ludwig was a Catholic monarchist, who prior to the Second World War published the "Weiße Blätter" (White Papers), an important publication of the conservative opposition to the Nazi regime. He belonged to the circle of anti-Hitler conspirators around Hans von Dohnányi, Justus Delbrück, and Hans Oster. After the failure of the 20 July plot he was arrested and later executed. His grandmother, Rosa Sophie Prinzessin von Arenberg (1922–2012), was a member of the House of Arenberg.

Guttenberg was born in Munich. He lived at his family castle in Guttenberg, Bavaria (district of Kulmbach), a village whose history is closely associated with the House of Guttenberg, and in a mansion in a refined part of Berlin, Berlin-Westend. The castle has been in the possession of the Guttenberg family since 1482. 

Guttenberg's father was Enoch zu Guttenberg, a conductor, who has been decorated with the Order of Merit of the Federal Republic of Germany (Officer's Cross) as well as the Bavarian Order of Merit. He has received many awards for his contributions to classical music, including the German Cultural Award and the Echo Klassik award.
Previously, Enoch zu Guttenberg also owned the winery estate Weingut Reichsrat von Buhl.

Guttenberg's mother, Christiane zu Eltz is a member of the Eltz family, which has strong ties with Croatia. She is the daughter of Ludwine, Countess Pejacsevich de Verocze. Her father was Jakob von und zu Eltz, a former President of the Association of Winemakers in Rheingau who became active in Croatian politics after Croatian independence. She divorced Enoch zu Guttenberg in 1977, and Karl-Theodor grew up with his father. His mother married secondly Adolf Richard Barthold von Ribbentrop, owner of an Eltville art gallery and son of Joachim von Ribbentrop, in 1985, and has two children from her second marriage. Guttenberg has a younger brother, Philipp Franz zu Guttenberg (born 1973), who married a daughter of Godfrey Macdonald, 8th Baron Macdonald.

In February 2000, Guttenberg married Stephanie Gräfin von Bismarck-Schönhausen (born 1976), a great-great-granddaughter of the first Chancellor of Germany Otto von Bismarck. They have two daughters. Guttenberg is Catholic, while his wife is Protestant (Lutheran). In September 2011, it became known that Guttenberg had bought a house for his family in Greenwich, Connecticut, close to New York City.

Awards 
Guttenberg was awarded the "Politikaward" in 2009, which is a German "Politician of the Year" award. It was awarded by politik & kommunikation, a German periodical for political communications.

In 2010, the German news magazine Focus named him "Man of the Year". 

In 2011, the Carneval Association of Aachen awarded him the "Order Against Dead Seriousness" (Orden wider den tierischen Ernst), although he did not attend the ceremony in person, sending instead his younger brother.

References

Selected publications

Books

Articles

External links 

  
 Parliament biography 
 CSIS - Karl-Theodor zu Guttenberg
 Spitzberg Partners
 Google Zeitgeist – Europe At The Crossroads

1971 births
Living people
Barons of Germany
Defence ministers of Germany
Economy ministers of Germany
German anti-communists
German Roman Catholics
Karl Theodor
Members of the Bundestag for Bavaria
Businesspeople from Munich
People involved in plagiarism controversies
University of Bayreuth alumni
Members of the Bundestag 2009–2013
Members of the Bundestag 2005–2009
Members of the Bundestag 2002–2005
Members of the Bundestag for the Christian Social Union in Bavaria
Politicians from Munich
Eltz